Kabul United F.C. is a football team in Afghanistan. They play in the Afghan First League.

Football clubs in Afghanistan
Sport in Kabul

Founded by Nizamuddin Arsh